Edward William West (1824-1905), usually styled E. W. West, was a scholarly English engineer, orientalist, and translator of Zoroastrian texts. He was educated at King's College London. He prepared five volumes of Pahlavi texts (the Marvels of Zoroastrianism) for Prof. Max Müller's monumental Sacred Books of the East series, published from the years 1880 to 1897.

References

1824 births
1905 deaths
Alumni of King's College London
British Indologists
Zoroastrian studies scholars